Mike Fantastic is a British electropop artist formed in 2010. Mike Fantastic was initially made notable by their début on Britain's Got Talent in May 2010, and have since released an album and two singles.

History
The band's first performance and début TV appearance was as an audition for the 2010 series of Britain's Got Talent, in which they were well received. They performed with five band members, consisting of Owen Sheppard on vocals, Michael Rudge on keyboards and electronics, Matt Birch on bass. Michael Rudge subsequently left the band as a result of pre-existing commitments. They have performed on tour with Peter Andre and have also played with The Overtones, Olly Murs and performed alongside them.

In November 2011, the band ended for a short period due to management issues, returning in February 2012 with Owen being the only remaining member.

Musical style and influences
The band's music is influenced by funk, disco-pop and dubstep music from current and past decades, and draws inspiration from Earth Wind & Fire, Prince, La Roux and Alphabeat, among others.

Their music style was created through a desire to move away from guitars and the 'generic rock' sounds of their previous bands.

Band members
Current members
 Owen Sheppard - lead vocals, production, programming, percussion, song writing (2010–2011, 2012–present)
Former members
 Michael Rudge - keyboard, electronics (2010)

Discography

Albums

Singles

References

External links
 Mike Fantastic on AllMusic

Britain's Got Talent contestants
Musical groups from Cardiff
Musical groups established in 2010
Sony BMG artists
British electronic music groups
2010 establishments in Wales